Vivian Alderson Metcalfe (5 March 1906 – 28 December 1967) was an Anglo-Irish cricketer.  Metcalfe was a right-handed batsman.  He was born in Saltburn-by-the-Sea, Yorkshire.

Metcalfe made a single first-class appearance for Wales against the touring West Indians in 1928.  In this match, he scored 18 runs in the Welsh first-innings before being dismissed by James Neblett, while in their second-innings he wasn't required to bat.  He later made three first-class appearances for Ireland in 1936, playing against Scotland, the touring Indians and the Marylebone Cricket Club.  In his three first-class appearances for Ireland, he scored 63 runs at an average of 10.50, with a high score of 36.

He died in Addlestone, Surrey on 28 December 1967.

References

External links
Vivian Metcalfe at ESPNcricinfo
Vivian Metcalfe at CricketArchive

1906 births
1967 deaths
People from Saltburn-by-the-Sea
English cricketers
Wales cricketers
Ireland cricketers